The 2023 Kallar Kahar bus accident occurred on 19 February 2023, near Kallar Kahar, Pakistan. The accident took place when a bus carrying a wedding party from Islamabad to Lahore lost control and fell into a ravine, killing at least 14 people and injuring 64 others.

Background
According to the rescue and police officials, the bus driver lost control of the vehicle when its brakes failed, and it collided with two cars coming from the opposite side of the Islamabad-Lahore motorway. The accident resulted in the deaths of 12 passengers on the spot, while two others died at the hospital on the same day. The driver of the bus was also among those who died in the accident.

The injured were immediately taken to the Tehsil Headquarters Hospital in Kallar Kahar and Rawalpindi for medical treatment. The wedding party, which included women and children, was returning to Lahore after attending the wedding ceremony in Islamabad.

The DC of Chakwal, Quratulain Malik, stated that six passengers were in critical condition and were immediately rushed to Rawalpindi. The rescue teams had to cut the damaged bus to take out the injured and dead bodies. The accident occurred on a dangerous patch of the Islamabad-Lahore motorway, which passes through the hilly area of Salt Range near Kallar Kahar.

Reactions
The Prime Minister of Pakistan, Shehbaz Sharif, expressed his condolences to the families of the deceased and directed the authorities to provide the best medical facilities to the injured people.

National Assembly Speaker Raja Pervaiz Ashraf and Deputy Speaker Zahid Akram Durrani also expressed deep sorrow and regret over the tragic accident, praying for the deceased and the speedy recovery of the injured.

References

2023 in Punjab, Pakistan
2023 road incidents
Bus incidents in Pakistan
Chakwal District
Disasters in Punjab, Pakistan
February 2023 events in Pakistan